Flag of City and County of Honolulu is a city flag used by Honolulu, the capital of Hawaii. The flag consists of the seal of the county and city on a yellow field. The flag was adopted in 1960.

The flag contains symbolism coming from both inside and outside of the city. The shield depicted in the flag has been used since 1985 when a republic was established after the overthrow of the kingdom. The yellow color present in both the shield and the flag represent the island of O‘ahu (yellow being the color yellow ‘ilima).

 Pūlo‘ulo‘u: used to mark kapu for the commoners during the times of monarchy
 Red, blue and white stripes: from the state flag 
 Rising sun: new era
 Star in the middle: Hawaii itself

References 

Flags of cities in the United States
Honolulu County, Hawaii